I-Caught (rendered as "i-CAUGHT") was an ABC News newsmagazine program hosted by Bill Weir which ran from August 7 to September 11, 2007 at 10:00 PM ET. Originally a midseason project, the series aired during the summer.

i-CAUGHT featured news stories based on video images captured by cell phones, webcams, surveillance cams, and the internet – as well as looking at what happens to the people involved after their video is seen publicly.

Among those featured in the premiere was liquid dancer David Bernal, better known to the video-viewing public as David Elsewhere.

References

External links
 Official website

American Broadcasting Company original programming
2000s American television news shows
2007 American television series debuts
2007 American television series endings
ABC News